Kumar Rajarathnam (13 March 1942 – 27 September 2015) was an Indian Barrister and former Chief Justice of the Madhya Pradesh High Court. He was the first barrister to be appointed a judge, after the Independence of India.

Career
Rajarathnam studied at Loyola College, Chennai and was called to the Bar from Gray's lnn. He was enrolled as an advocate on 10 March 1971 and started his lawyer career in the Madras High Court. On 1 January 1994 he was appointed the Judge of Madras High Court. Justice Rajarathnam was transferred to the Karnataka High Court on 24 January 1994. He was elevated in the post of Chief Justice of the Madhya Pradesh High Court in September 2003. Rajarathnam retired in 2004 and became the second Chairman of the Securities Appellate Tribunal in Mumbai since 20 March 2004 to 20 December 2005. In 2015, he died in Chennai at the age of 73.

References

1942 births
2015 deaths
Indian judges
Chief Justices of the Madhya Pradesh High Court
Judges of the Madras High Court
Judges of the Karnataka High Court
Members of Gray's Inn
Indian barristers
20th-century Indian judges
21st-century Indian judges
20th-century Indian lawyers
21st-century Indian lawyers
People from Tamil Nadu
University of Madras alumni
Loyola College, Chennai alumni